The Clinton health care plan was a 1993 healthcare reform package proposed by the administration of President Bill Clinton and closely associated with the chair of the task force devising the plan, First Lady of the United States Hillary Clinton.

President Clinton had campaigned heavily on health care in the 1992 presidential election. The task force was created in January 1993, but its own processes were somewhat controversial and drew litigation. Its goal was to come up with a comprehensive plan to provide universal health care for all Americans, which was to be a cornerstone of the administration's first-term agenda. The president delivered a major health care speech to the US Congress in September 1993, during which he proposed an enforced mandate for employers to provide health insurance coverage to all of their employees.

Opposition to the plan was heavy from conservatives, libertarians, and the health insurance industry. The industry produced a highly effective television ad, "Harry and Louise", in an effort to rally public support against the plan.

Instead of uniting behind the original proposal, many Democrats offered a number of competing plans of their own. Hillary Clinton was drafted by the Clinton Administration to head a new Task Force and sell the plan to the American people, which ultimately backfired amid the barrage from the pharmaceutical and health insurance industries and considerably diminished her own popularity. On September 26, 1994, the final compromise Democratic bill was declared dead by Senate Majority Leader George J. Mitchell.

Provisions 

According to an address to Congress by then-President Bill Clinton on September 22, 1993, the proposed bill would provide a "health care security card" to every citizen that would irrevocably entitle them to medical treatment and preventative services, including for pre-existing conditions.

To achieve this, the Clinton health plan required each US citizen and permanent resident alien to become enrolled in a qualified health plan on his or her own or through programs mandated to be offered by businesses with more than 5,000 full-time employees. Subsidies were to be provided to those too poor to afford coverage, including complete subsidies for those below a set income level. Users would choose plans offered by regional health alliances to be established by each state. These alliances would purchase insurance coverage for the state's residents and could set fees for doctors who charge per procedure. The act provided funding to be sent to the states for the administration of the plan, beginning at $14 billion in 1993 and reaching $38 billion by 2003.

The plan also specified which benefits must be offered; a National Health Board to oversee the quality of health care services; enhanced physician training; the creation of model information systems; federal funding in the case of the insolvency of state programs; rural health programs; long-term care programs; coverage for abortions, with a "conscience clause" to exempt practitioners with religious objections; malpractice and antitrust reform; fraud prevention measures; and a prescription drug benefit for Medicare, among other features.

Task Force 

Once in office, Bill Clinton quickly set up the Task Force on National Health Care Reform, headed by First Lady Hillary Clinton, to come up with a comprehensive plan to provide universal health care for all Americans, which was to be a cornerstone of the administration's first-term agenda. He delivered a major health care speech to a joint session of Congress on September 22, 1993. In that speech, he explained the problem:

Her leading role in the project was unprecedented for a presidential spouse. This unusual decision by the president to put his wife in charge of the project has been attributed to several factors, such as his desire to emphasize his personal commitment to the enterprise.

Criticism 

After President Clinton announced the formation of the Task Force, media began to criticize the secrecy surrounding its deliberations, eventually leading to a public disclosure of the names of those involved.

Starting on September 28, 1993, Hillary Clinton appeared for several days of testimony before five congressional committees on health care. Opponents of the bill organized against it before it was presented to the Democratic-controlled Congress on November 20, 1993. The bill was a complex proposal of more than 1,000 pages, the core element of which was an enforced mandate for employers to provide health insurance coverage to all of their employees. The full text of the November 20 bill (the Health Security Act) is available online.

Prominent opposition to the Clinton plan was led by William Kristol and his policy group Project for the Republican Future, which is widely credited with orchestrating the plan's defeat through a series of now legendary "policy memos" faxed to Republican leaders.

Conservatives, libertarians, and the health insurance industry proceeded to campaign against the plan, criticizing it as being overly bureaucratic and restrictive of patient choice. The conservative Heritage Foundation argued that "the Clinton Administration is imposing a top-down, command-and-control system of global budgets and premium caps, a superintending National Health Board and a vast system of government sponsored regional alliances, along with a panoply of advisory boards, panels, and councils, interlaced with the expanded operations of the agencies of Department of Health and Human Services and the Department of Labor, issuing innumerable rules, regulations, guidelines, and standards."

The effort also included extensive advertising criticizing the plan, including the famous "Harry and Louise" ad, paid for by the Health Insurance Association of America, which depicted a middle-class couple despairing over the plan's complex, bureaucratic nature. Time, CBS News, CNN, The Wall Street Journal, and The Christian Science Monitor ran stories questioning whether there really was a health care crisis. Op-eds were written against it, including one in The Washington Post by conservative University of Virginia Professor Martha Derthick that said,
 Democratic Senator Daniel Patrick Moynihan qualified his agreement that "there is no health care crisis" by stating "there is an insurance crisis" but also indicated "anyone who thinks [the Clinton health care plan] can work in the real world as presently written isn't living in it."

Meanwhile, instead of uniting behind the President's original proposal, other Democrats offered a number of competing plans of their own. Some criticized the plan from the left, preferring a single-payer healthcare system.

Litigation
The First Lady's role in the secret proceedings of the Health Care Task Force also sparked litigation in the U.S. Court of Appeals for the D.C. Circuit in relation to the Federal Advisory Committee Act (FACA), which requires openness in government. The Clinton White House argued that the Recommendation Clause in Article II of the US Constitution would make it unconstitutional to apply the procedural requirements of FACA to her participation in the meetings of the Task Force. Some constitutional experts argued to the court that such a legal theory was not supported by the text, the history, or the structure of the Constitution. Ultimately, Hillary Clinton won the litigation in June 1993, when the D.C. Circuit ruled narrowly that the First Lady could be deemed a government official (and not a mere private citizen) for the purpose of not having to comply with the procedural requirements of FACA.

Also in February 1993, the Association of American Physicians and Surgeons, along with several other groups, filed a lawsuit against Hillary Clinton and Donna Shalala over closed-door meetings related to the health care plan. The AAPS sued to gain access to the list of members of the task force. In 1997, Judge Royce C. Lamberth found in favor of the plaintiffs and awarded $285,864 to the AAPS for legal costs; Lamberth also harshly criticized the Clinton administration and Clinton aide Ira Magaziner in his ruling. Subsequently, in 1999, a federal appeals court overturned the award and the initial findings on the basis that Magaziner and the administration had not acted in bad faith.

Defeat 
In August 1994, Democratic Senate Majority Leader George J. Mitchell introduced a compromise proposal that would have delayed requirements of employers until 2002 and exempted small businesses. However, "even with Mitchell’s bill, there were not enough Democratic Senators behind a single proposal to pass a bill, let alone stop a filibuster."

A few weeks later, Mitchell announced that his compromise plan was dead and that health care reform would have to wait at least until the next Congress. The defeat was embarrassing for the administration, emboldened Republicans, and contributed to the notion that Hillary Clinton was a "big-government liberal" as decried by conservative opponents.

The 1994 mid-term election became, in the opinion of one media observer, a "referendum on big government – Hillary Clinton had launched a massive health-care reform plan that wound up strangled by its own red tape". In that 1994 election, the Republican revolution, led by Newt Gingrich, gave the GOP control of both the House of Representatives and the Senate for the first time since the 83rd Congress of 1953–1954, ending prospects for a Clinton-sponsored health care overhaul.

Comprehensive health care reform in the United States was not seriously considered or enacted by Congress until Barack Obama's election in 2008, and the country remains without universal health care.

Controversy in retrospect and perspective 
In 2004, as a US senator from New York, Hillary Clinton argued in The New York Times that the current health care system is unsustainable, and she offered several solutions. Her article also mentioned areas of agreement with onetime opponent Newt Gingrich, and likewise, Gingrich has expressed agreement with Clinton on some aspects of health care, including a bill to modernize medical record keeping.

In 2005, referring to her previous efforts at health care reform, she said, "I learned some valuable lessons about the legislative process, the importance of bipartisan cooperation and the wisdom of taking small steps to get a big job done." Again in 2007, she reflected on her role in 1993–1994: "I think that both the process and the plan were flawed. We were trying to do something that was very hard to do, and we made a lot of mistakes."

She received hundreds of thousands of dollars in campaign contributions from doctors, hospitals, drug companies, and insurance companies for her 2006 re-election in the Senate, including several insurance companies that were members of the Health Insurance Association of America that helped defeat the Clinton Health Plan in 1994. Charles N. Kahn III, a Republican who was executive vice president of the Health Insurance Association in 1993 and 1994, refers to his previous battles with Clinton as "ancient history", and says "she is extremely knowledgeable about health care and has become a Congressional leader on the issue."

Until the Affordable Healthcare for America Act, a combination of factors kept health care off the top of the agenda. For example, politicians were not eager to confront the forces that successfully frustrated the Clinton effort, health maintenance organizations were able to limit cost increases to some extent, and a conservative Republican majority in Congress or a conservative Republican president was in power or in office.

The Clinton health care plan remains the most prominent national proposal associated with Hillary Clinton and may have influenced her prospects in the 2008 presidential election. There are some similarities between Clinton's plan and Republican Mitt Romney's health care plan, which has been implemented in Massachusetts, though Romney has since distanced himself from Clinton on the issue, in particular arguing that his plan calls for more control at the state level and the private market, not from the federal government.

In September 2007, former Clinton Administration senior health policy advisor Paul Starr published an article, "The Hillarycare Mythology", and he wrote that Bill, not Hillary, Clinton, was the driving force behind the plan at all stages of its origination and development; the task force headed by her quickly became useless and was not the primary force behind formulating the proposed policy; and "[n]ot only did the fiction of Hillary's personal responsibility for the health plan fail to protect the president at the time, it has also now come back to haunt her in her own quest for the presidency."

See also 

 Health Security Express
 History of health care reform in the United States

References

External links 
 C-SPAN3 Programming from 1993–94 on the Clinton Health Care Plan C-SPAN, Accessed June 8, 2007.
 Robin Toner, " Clinton's Health Plan; Poll on Changes in Health Care Finds Support Amid Skepticism," The New York Times, September 22, 1993. Accessed June 8, 2007.
 "The Clinton Health Care Plan: Fundamental or Incremental Reform?" Annals of Intern Med, 1993;119(9):945–947. Accessed June 8, 2007.
 William Kristol, "How to Oppose the Health Plan – and Why," Ashbrook Center, January 1994. Accessed June 8, 2007.
 "AAFP calls Clinton health care plan a 'starting point for reform," Findarticles.com reprinting American Family Physician, January 1994. Accessed June 8, 2007.
 Robert Pear, "Health Care Plan Isn't Cast in Stone," The New York Times, January 22, 1994. Accessed June 8, 2007.
 Donna Shalala, "Let's Face It, There Is a Health Care Crisis," U.S. Department of Health and Human Services. Reprinted from The Washington Post, January 25, 1994. Accessed June 8, 2007.
 Adam Clymer, "Hillary Clinton Tells Doctors Crisis in Health Care Is Real," The New York Times, January 29, 1994. Accessed June 8, 2007.
 "The Rise and Fall of the Political Catchphrase,"  Time, February 14, 1994. Traces the origins of the Republican counter-argument "there is no health care crisis." Accessed June 8, 2007.
 Raymond Hernandez and Robert Pear, "Once an Enemy, Health Industry Warms to Clinton," The New York Times, July 12, 2006. Accessed June 9, 2007.
 Jonathan Cohn, "Hillary was Right – The health care plan that dares not speak its name," The New Republic, June 5, 2007. Accessed June 8, 2007.
 Booknotes interview with David Broder on The System: The American Way of Politics at the Breaking Point, May 5, 1996.

Clinton health care plan
Clinton administration controversies
Health Care Plan
Healthcare reform in the United States
Healthcare reform legislation in the United States
Health Care plan
Hillary Clinton controversies
United States proposed federal health legislation